Feral chickens are derived from domestic chickens (Gallus gallus domesticus) who have returned to the wild. Like the red junglefowl (the closest wild relative of domestic chickens), feral chickens will roost in bushes in order to avoid predators at night.

Feral chickens typically form social groups composed of a dominant cockerel, several hens, and subordinate cocks. Sometimes the dominant cockerel is designated by a fight between cocks.

Locations famous for feral chickens

America
Fair Oaks, California,  United States
Vieques, Puerto Rico, United States 
Yuba City, California, United States
Fitzgerald, Georgia, United States
Key West, Florida, United States
Gotha, Florida, United States
Miami, Florida, United States
Kauai, Hawaii, United States
Los Angeles, California, United States
St. Augustine, Florida, United States
San Juan Bautista, California, United States
Houston, Texas, United States
U.S. Virgin Islands
New Orleans, Louisiana, United States
Oviedo, Florida, United States
Ybor City, Florida, United States

Asia
 Jaffa, Tel Aviv, Israel

Australia
Galston Gorge, Sydney, New South Wales, Australia

Britain
Bermuda
George Town, Grand Cayman, Cayman Islands
Totton, Hampshire, England, Great Britain
British Virgin Islands
Chicken Roundabout (A143), Bungay, Suffolk, England, Great Britain

New Zealand
Niue
Port Chalmers, New Zealand

Guam
Forests of Guam, although not significantly integrated into the trophic levels in this location

See also 
Bekisar
Hollywood Freeway chickens
Chickens as pets

References

External links 
Chickens are Foragers, Not Fighters, By Karen Davis, PhD, United Poultry Concerns
Chicken Roundabout!
Chickens on White Oak Drive – HAIF

Domesticated birds
Introduced birds
Chicken, Feral
Chicken, Feral
Chickens